The 2005 FIBA Europe Under-16 Championship Division B was an international basketball competition held in Bulgaria in 2005.

Medalists
1.   Germany

2.   Portugal 

3.   Georgia

Final ranking
1.  Germany

2.  Estonia

3.  England

4.  Slovakia

5.  Portugal

6.  Georgia

7.  Cyprus

8.  Finland

9.  Ireland

10.  Bosnia and Herzegovina

11.  Bulgaria

12.  Czech Republic

13.  Macedonia

14.  Hungary

15.  Romania

16.  Netherlands

17.  Sweden

18.  Austria

External links
FIBA Archive

FIBA U16 European Championship Division B
2005–06 in European basketball
2005–06 in Bulgarian basketball
International youth basketball competitions hosted by Bulgaria